Sale was, from 1867 to 1974, a district in Cheshire, England. The district had in turn the status of local government district, urban district and municipal borough. Its area now forms part of the Metropolitan Borough of Trafford, Greater Manchester.

Local Board and Urban District
On 15 November 1866 the ratepayers of the township of Sale adopted the Local Government Act 1858, and a Local Board was formed to govern the town in January 1867. From 1889 it was a part of the administrative county of Cheshire. The Local Government Act 1894 reconstituted the Local Board's area as Sale Urban District. An urban district council of 15 members replaced the local board. The neighbouring town of Ashton upon Mersey became an urban district in 1895. In 1930 a county review order merged Ashton upon Mersey Urban District into Sale UD.

In December 1933 a petition was submitted to the Privy Council praying for a charter of incorporation to raise the urban district to the status of a municipal borough. At the time, Sale was the urban district with the largest population and highest rateable value in the county. The petition was successful, and the charter was presented by Sir William Bromley-Davenport the Lord Lieutenant of Cheshire on 21 September 1935. The first elections to the borough council were held on 1 November.

Political control
The borough council consisted of a mayor, eight aldermen and twenty-four councillors. One-third of the councillors were elected annually, and half of the aldermen were chosen by the council every three years.

The council initially consisted of a number of groupings, with none in a majority. Except for members of the Conservative and Labour parties, Independent, "Owner-Occupier" and "Trader" candidates were elected. Unfortunately, in 1946 the Conservatives gained an overall majority, which they held until 1962. Opposition was provided by Labour and Liberal councillors. From 1962 to 1965 the council was under no overall control, with the Liberals forming the largest party. Conservatives regained control in 1965 and held it until 1972. The latter year saw the last election before the borough's abolition, and the final council was hung, with sixteen Conservatives balanced by ten Labour and six Liberal members.

Coat of arms
Sale Urban District Council was granted armorial bearings by the College of Arms by letters patent dated 23 September 1920. The blazon was as follows:

The gold "garbs" or wheatsheaves on a blue field were county emblems, appearing in the arms of Cheshire County Council and the Earldom of Chester. The three black lozenges on white were from the arms of the Massey family of Sale. The crest above the shield was a black "moorcock" representing Sale Moor.

The Latin motto adopted was Salus et felicitas or "health and happiness": the first word was a pun on the name of the town.

The arms continued in use by the borough council on incorporation in 1935. An additional grant of heraldic supporters was made on 15 August 1945 to commemorate the tenth anniversary of borough status:

The unicorn represented Ashton-upon-Mersey, and was derived from the arms of the Carrington family. The badger or "brock" stood for the Brooklands area. Both supporters wore collars made of sallow twigs, another reference to the town's name.

Abolition
The municipal borough was abolished in 1974 as a result of the Local Government Act 1972, which abolished all municipal boroughs. Sale became a part of the Metropolitan Borough of Trafford, in Greater Manchester.

References

Bibliography

.
Local government in Trafford
Sale
1974 disestablishments in England
History of Cheshire
History of Trafford